Clostridium carboxidivorans  is a Gram-positive anaerobic, spore-forming and motile bacterium from the genus Clostridium which has been isolated from an agricultural lagoon in Oklahoma in the United States.

Clostridium carboxidivorans is capable of fermenting carbon monoxide, hydrogen, and carbon dioxide, and produce ethanol, butanol and hexanol as end-products. C. carboxidivorans does this using the wood-ljungdahl pathway.

References

 

Bacteria described in 2005
carboxidivorans